A referendum (in some countries synonymous with plebiscite, or a vote on a ballot question) is a direct vote in which an entire electorate is asked to either accept or reject a particular proposal. This article summarises referendum laws and practice in various countries.

Summary table

Africa

Egypt

On 19 March 2011 a constitutional referendum was held in Egypt, following the Egyptian Revolution of 2011. The reforms made it easier for candidates to run for president, limited the number of presidential terms to two four-year periods, and ensured judicial monitoring of elections.

Eritrea
In April 1993 nearly 1 million voters in Eritrea (a quarter of the population), cast ballots to become "sovereign and independent" of Ethiopia. This vote was the result of thirty years of war by Eritreans during their War of Independence. The result was a vote for independence by 99.8% of the voters.

Kenya 

Kenya has had three referendums.

Morocco
There have been several referendums in Morocco, most of which were related to the Moroccan constitution. Since becoming King, Mohammed VI has led many reforms that made Morocco an exception from all the other Arab countries. On February 20, 2011, thousands took to the streets of Rabat, Casablanca, Tangier and Marrakesh in peaceful protests demanding a new constitution, a change in government and an end to corruption. During a march on Hassan II Avenue in Rabat, demonstrators demanded a new constitution to bring more democracy to the country. They shouted slogans calling for economic opportunity, education reform, better health services, and help in coping with the rising cost of living.

On March 9, King Mohammed VI made a speech that was described as a "historical" speech in which he announced several reforms including a new constitution to the country.

In a televised speech on Friday, 17 June, King Mohammed VI announced a series of constitutional reforms, to be put to a national referendum on 1 July. The proposed reforms would give the prime minister and the parliament more executive authority, and would make Berber an official language in Morocco, together with Arabic. The proposal would empower the prime minister with the authority to appoint government officials and to dissolve the parliament - the powers previously held by the king. However, the king would remain the military commander-in-chief and would retain his position as the chair of the Council of Ministers and the Supreme Security Council, the primary bodies responsible for the security policy. A new constitutional provision would also confirm the king's role as the highest religious authority in the country.

Although most people were celebrating among the protesters after the King's speech, the leaders of the 20 February Movement rejected the proposals as insufficient and called for continuing protests on 19 June 2011. On 29 June 2011, the protesters called for a boycott of the referendum. The referendum was held on June 1, and almost all Moroccans said yes to it with a "98% yes" "2% No" turnout.

Asia

Bangladesh 

 A constitutional referendum was held in Bangladesh on 15 September 1991. Voters were asked "Should or not the President assent to the Constitution (Twelfth Amendment) Bill, 1991 of the People's Republic of Bangladesh?" The amendments would lead to the reintroduction of parliamentary government, with the President becoming the constitutional head of state, but the Prime Minister the executive head. It also abolished the position of Vice-President and would see the President elected by Parliament. The result saw 83.6% vote in favour, with a turnout of 35.2%.[1]

East Timor
East Timor, formerly governed by Indonesia, held a referendum on 30 August 1999, in which voters chose either to become a Special Autonomous Region within Indonesia, or for independence. 78.5% of voters opted for independence.

Hong Kong

Due to discontent towards the proposal of political reform made by the Hong Kong government, the Civic Party and the League of Social Democrats joined to carry out "Five Constituencies Referendum" in early 2010, by having one Legislative Councillor (from either one of the parties) in each constituency resigned, forcing the government to carry out a by-election, thus giving a chance for all voters to show their will towards universal suffrage and the abolition of functional constituencies. This is often called a "de facto referendum".

The Basic Law of Hong Kong does not provide for official referendums, but the pan-democrats hope that by returning the resignees to the Legislative Council, on their manifesto of real political reform in Hong Kong and the abolition of functional constituencies, the election can be seen as a de facto referendum and an endorsement of these issues.

The original five pan-democrat Legislative Councillors were re-elected, the turnout was much lower than the expectation of the two parties, due to the suppression of pro-Beijing Camp.

India
The Constitution of India does not have a specific provision for or against referendum. Some of the referendums held in India are:
1947 Sylhet referendum was held in Sylhet district on 6 July 1947 to decide whether the district would remain in Assam and join the newly formed country India or would join East Bengal (present day Bangladesh), a part of the newly formed country Pakistan. The referendum was in favor of joining East Bengal.
1947 North-West Frontier Province referendum was held in the North-West Frontier Province of British India in July 1947 to decide whether the province would join the Dominion of India or Pakistan. The referendum was in favor of joining Pakistan.
1967 Goa status referendum was held in the state of Goa, India, on 16 January 1967, to decide the future of the Union Territory of Goa.
1975 Sikkimese monarchy referendum on abolishing the monarchy was held in Sikkim on 14th April 1975. It was approved by 97.55% of voters, and resulted in Sikkim becoming an Indian state.

Indonesia
Constitution of Indonesia does not mention referendums at all, and as such, referendums are not a part of Indonesian political practice. In 1985, the People's Consultative Assembly issued Act No. 5 of 1985 that officially recognized constitutional referendum as a legitimate political process in Indonesia, but revoked in 1999 by Act No. 6 of 1999. According to explanation given in Act No. 6 of 1999, referendum is not compatible with Indonesian doctrine of representative democracy, as on the fourth principles of the national ideology Pancasila, absence on mentions of referendums inside the national constitution also became another reason why the referendum law was revoked.

Indonesia had no nationwide referendum, but only regional one and concerning only on territorial changes. In 1969, Act of Free Choice (PEPERA) integrated Papua into Indonesia; despite the name reflecting a referendum, the process actually only involving around 1,000 representatives in a process of deliberation. An independence referendum in East Timor province took place in 1999, paving the way of East Timor province independence from Indonesia in 2002.

Iran
In 1979 and after the Islamic Revolution had toppled the Iranian monarchy, a referendum was held to choose the future governing system of the country. The question was a simple yes or no to the Islamic Republic, a system which combines direct representation with religious authority. The Islamic Republic was established after more than 98% of the population voted "Yes".
1989 Iranian constitutional referendum has also been held later, in which 97.57% voted 'yes'.

Iraq

The current Constitution of Iraq was approved by referendum on 15 October 2005, two years after the United States-led invasion. The constitution was designed to shift crucial decisions about government, the judiciary and human rights to a future national assembly. It was later modified to provide for the establishment of a committee by the parliament to be elected in December 2005 to consider changes to the constitution in 2006.

Malaysia
The Malaysian Constitution does not mention referendums at all. There have been no referendums in Malaysian history.

Pakistan
General Pervez Musharraf held a referendum in Pakistan on 30 April 2002 to legitimize his presidency and assure its continuance after the approaching restoration of democracy. He thus extended his term to five years after the October 2002 elections. The voter turnout was 80 percent by most estimates, amidst claims of irregularities. A few weeks later, Musharraf went on TV and apologized to the nation for "irregularities" in the referendum.

Philippines 

The Constitution of the Philippines can only be amended or revised via a national plebiscite. Alteration of boundaries of autonomous regions, provinces, towns, cities and barangays (villages), including creation, merger and upgrading of new local government units from existing ones, are to be decided on local plebiscites amongst the affected places. A referendum is the final step in the approval of a people's initiative. All referendums are binding.

The present constitution was approved via a plebiscite in 1987. The last provincial-level plebiscite was for the division of Palawan province into three provinces in 2021, which was rejected.

Russia
The Russian Constitution of 1993 was adopted by a controversial referendum.

Popular referendum can be called by two millions registered voters, provided they do so from at least 42 separate regions of Russia within two months, with no more than 50,000 signatures collected in any single region. The question must first be approved by the Central Election Commission.

Singapore
According to the Constitution of Singapore, a referendum can be held in a few circumstances, including situations when a constitutional amendment passed by the Parliament is rejected by the President, or when the nation's sovereignty needs to be decided (i.e., merger or incorporation into other countries).  to date, the 1962 national referendum which decided the terms of a merger of Singapore into Malaysia. There were three choices: 1) To merge with Malaya, having autonomy in labour and education; 2) To merge with Malaya, having same status as the other states in Malaya; 3) To merge with Malaya, having terms similar to those of the Borneo territories. Option #1 won with 71% of the vote. Two years after the merger, Singapore's expulsion from Malaysia occurred on 9 August 1965 due to disagreements between the two political ideas.

Taiwan

The Referendum Act was promoted and introduced by the Democratic Progressive Party for years and then enacted by the Legislative Yuan in 2003. There had been six national referendums and two local referendums in Taiwan before several sections of the Referendum Act were revised to lower the threshold in December 2017. No national referendum had been approved until then. Following amendments to the law, ten more questions were asked at the national level during the 2018.

Thailand
On 4 September 2008, amidst hundreds of thousands of protesters demanding the government resign, Thailand's premier Samak Sundaravej's government approved the idea of a referendum to ask the Thai electorate if it wanted to keep the government or not.

Europe

Austria

The Austrian constitution defines two types of referendums on the federal level: binding referendum and non-binding referendum. Binding referendum is mandatory if the President should be removed from office before the end of his term, and in case of comprehensive change of the Federal Constitution. Binding referendum is facultative (not mandatory) in case of non-comprehensive changes in the Federal Constitution. 
There was only one binding referendum in post-1945 Austria: European Union membership referendum.

The National Council has the power to call on a non-binding referendum on matters of great importance. There were two such referendums in post-1945 Austria: nuclear power referendum in 1978, and conscription referendum in 2013.

Belgium

Binding referendums in Belgium are not legally possible because of the constitutional principle that the country's powers are exercised by the nation and not by the people. Consequently, Belgium is a representative democracy, almost without any form of direct democracy.

Non-binding referendums on the municipal and provincial level are allowed. Non-binding referendums on the regional level are also allowed by law but the implementation decisions are lacking.  This way government makes it impossible to make use of it.

Bulgaria

Five nationwide referendums have been held in Bulgaria since it gained its De Facto independence in 1878:
 On 19 November 1922 the question was if criminals from the three previous wars were to be prosecuted;
 On 8 September 1946 the question was if Bulgaria was to remain a monarchy or to become a republic;
 On 16 May 1971 the nation's approval of a new constitution was asked;
 On 27 January 2013 the question was if Bulgaria should develop its nuclear power by building a new nuclear power plant.
 On 6 November 2016 a three question referendum was held alongside the presidential elections.
Several regional referendums have been held as well.

Croatia

Referendums in Croatia can be called by:
 The Croatian Parliament
 The President of Croatia
 The population 
The institution of a referendum is regulated by article 87. of the constitution of Croatia. Referendums can be called on any issue falling within the competence of the Croatian Parliament or on any other issue which the President of Croatia considers to be important for the independence, unity and existence of the Republic.

Since amendments to the constitution in 2001, the Parliament is obligated by constitution to call a referendum if signatures of 10% of registered voters in the Republic of Croatia are collected. The time frame for collecting the signatures is defined by the law on referendums, and it is 15 days.

Cyprus

Constitution of Cyprus has no mention of referendum (as of 2013). The only referendum to take place in independent Cyprus was a referendum on the Annan Plan.

Czech Republic

There are no provisions concerning referendums in the Constitution of the Czech Republic, except for "referendum concerning the accession of the Czech Republic to the European Union". Therefore, the only referendum ever held in the Czech Republic at the national level was Czech European Union membership referendum in 2003.

It is possible to hold a referendum at regional and municipal levels.

Denmark

In Denmark, after a law has been passed by parliament, one third of the members can demand a referendum. This does not apply to money bills or expropriation. A law that transfers sovereignty to an international organisation must be subjected to a referendum unless five-sixths of the MPs vote for it. In both cases, to defeat the law the no votes must not only outnumber the yes votes, they must also number at least 30% of the electorate. Since all referendums have had much more than 60% turnout, no bill has yet passed due to lack of interest.

In practice, referendums have been held every time new treaties of the European Union have been approved, even when more than five-sixths can be found. Recently, the Danish government was highly criticized when it did not hold a referendum regarding the controversial Lisbon treaty.

The Constitution of Denmark can be changed only after a referendum. To pass, the yes votes must not only outnumber the no votes, they must also number at least 40% of the electorate.

The present location of the border with Germany was determined by a referendum in 1920 after the German capitulation. See Schleswig.

Estonia

The Constitution of Estonia gives the Parliament of Estonia the power to submit a bill or other national issue to a binding referendum. If a bill which is submitted to a referendum does not receive a majority of votes in favour, the President of the Republic shall declare extraordinary elections to the Parliament.

There are some issues which cannot be submitted to the referendum: issues regarding the budget, taxation, financial obligations of the state, ratification and denunciation of international treaties, the declaration or termination of a state of emergency, or national defence.

Some parts of the Constitution can be amended only by a referendum, while the rest of Constitution can be amended either by a referendum or by other means.

A referendum was called by the Parliament of Estonia on two occasions since its independence from USSR was restored:
 a referendum on a new constitution and citizenship in 1992
 Estonian European Union membership referendum in 2003
Also, there was a referendum on Estonian independence in 1991 while Estonian SSR was still a part of the USSR.

Finland

The Constitution of Finland allows only for a non-binding referendum called on by the Parliament. If 50,000 Finnish citizens sign an initiative (for an act or a referendum), the Parliament has to discuss it, but the initiative is not binding.

As of 2013 there have been only two referendums in Finland:
 Finnish prohibition referendum in 1931
 Finnish European Union membership referendum in 1994.

France

Both Napoleon I (in power (1799-1815) and Napoleon III (in power 1848-1870) used plebiscites (rigged or otherwise: 1800, 1802, 1804, 1815, 1851, 1852, 1870) to support their political ascendancy.

The practice of referendums for tough decisions appeared with Charles De Gaulle's Fifth Republic, in order to overcome the Parliament. A referendum can be called by the President for constitutional changes, treaty ratification, laws concerning the administration or the territory. The political risks involved made the practice rare. Most constitutional revisions went through the super-majority of Parliament. Therefore, a procedure of popular initiative, backed by a handful of MPs, is being put in place.

Germany

Following World War II, West Germany was founded originally with only minor elements of direct democracy. At the federal level, there are only two mandatory constitutional referendum types. One type is for enacting a new constitution. Changes to the constitution do not require a public vote and there is no provision for an initiative for a constitutional amendment. There has never been a referendum of this type, although there was an argument in that direction during German reunification. The other type requires a regional public vote in case of restructuring the Bundesländer i.e. States (Neugliederung des Bundesgebietes, "New Arrangement of the Federal Territory") which led to a number of effectless referendums to create or recreate states or change the territory of a state. In addition there was a referendum on the merger of Baden and Württemberg into Baden-Württemberg in 1951 (accepted) and a referendum on the merger of Berlin and Brandenburg into Berlin-Brandenburg in 1996 (rejected).

Originally, only some of the Bundesländer (federated states) had provisions for a general binding referendum (Volksentscheid, "people's decision") on popular initiatives (Volksbegehren, "people's request"), with Hesse and Bavaria also having a mandatory binding referendum on changes to the state constitution. Over the years all states have changed their constitutions to allow various types of statewide and local referendums. In all states, there is now a general right for referendums on statewide popular initiatives, which was used in Hamburg to push the state government to pass a law on a facultative binding state referendum in 2007. Most states have a form of non-binding ballot question (Volksbefragung, "people's inquiry") which has rarely been used - the most important of these had been the 1955 Saar Statute referendum. General forms of direct democracy were introduced in the communities with facultative ballot questions (Bürgerbefragung, "citizens' inquiry") and public initiatives (Bürgerbegehren, "citizens' request") which are both non-binding. In some areas, this has been expanded into a binding referendum type (Bürgerentscheid, "citizens' decision").

Greece

The Constitution provides for two kinds of referendums:
 a referendum concerning a "passed law"
 a referendum concerning a matter of "national interest".

There were 8 referendums in Greece from 1920 to now. All but two have had to do with the form of government, namely retention/reestablishment or abolition of the monarchy. The two referendums not concerning the form of government was constitutional referendum in 1968 held by the military junta, and the 2015 Greek bailout referendum.

Hungary

The Constitution proscribes two ways to hold a referendum:
 upon the motion of at least two hundred thousand electors
 upon the motion of the President of the Republic, the Government or one hundred thousand electors.

The Constitution imposes a number of prohibitions on matters on which a referendum can be held, including amending Constitution, budget, taxing, obligations from international agreements, military operations, etc. Required voter turnout for the referendum to be valid is 50%. The decision made by a referendum is binding on the Parliament. There was one referendum in People's Republic of Hungary and there were 5 referendums in modern (post-1989) Hungary.   
 Migrant quota referendum (2016)

Iceland
The constitution of Iceland provides two articles on referendums:
 According to the 11th article, if 3/4 of the parliament votes to dismiss the president then that decision must be put to a binding referendum.
 According to the 26th article, should the president veto a bill from the parliament then it must be put to a binding referendum.

A total of 7 referendums have been held in Iceland, three of which were held after the nation declared independence and became a republic in 1944.

 Alcohol Prohibition referendum (1908)
 Community service referendum (1916)
 Sovereignty referendum (1918)
 Prohibition referendum (1933)
 Constitutional referendum (1944)
 Loan guarantees referendum (2010)
 Loan guarantees referendum (2011)
 Icelandic constitution non-binding referendum (2011)

Ireland
Constitutional referendums

The current Constitution of Ireland was adopted by plebiscite on 1 July 1937. In Ireland every constitutional amendment must be approved by referendum; 38 such referendums have occurred from the enactment of the current constitution to May 2019. Constitutional amendments are first adopted by both Houses of the Oireachtas (parliament), submitted to a referendum, and are signed into law by the President. The signature is merely a formality: the president cannot refuse to sign into law an amendment that has been approved in a referendum.

Ordinary referendums

Article 27 of the constitution provides for a referendum on an ordinary bill, known as an 'ordinary referendum'. Article 47 states that for such a referendum to successfully veto the bill, it must be voted down by both a majority of votes cast and at least 33 and one-third per cent of registered voters, otherwise it is deemed to have passed.

An ordinary referendum can occur in two circumstances.
First, if a bill is simply passed in the ordinary manner with a provision that it be sent to referendum.  Second, a bill that, in the opinion of the President, "is of such national importance that the will of the people ought to be ascertained" if requested to do so by a majority of Seanad Éireann and a third of Dáil Éireann.  Article 27 was intended for bills that were particularly contentious, controversial or of high importance.  Despite there having been many bills fitting these criteria, article 27 has never been used.

Italy

The constitution of Italy provides for two kinds of binding referendums.

A legislative referendum can be called in order to abrogate a law totally or partially, if requested by 500,000 electors or five regional councils. This kind of referendum is valid only if at least a majority of electors goes to the polling station. It is forbidden to call a referendum regarding financial laws or laws relating to pardons or the ratification of international treaties.

A constitutional referendum can be called in order to approve a constitutional law or amendment only when it has been approved by the Houses (Chamber of Deputies and Senate of the Republic) with a majority of less than two thirds in both or either House, and only at the request of one fifth of the members of either House, or 500,000 electors or five Regional Councils. A constitutional referendum is valid no matter how many electors go to the polling station. Any citizen entitled to vote in an election to the Chamber of Deputies may participate in a referendum.

Latvia

The Constitution of Latvia prescribes a referendum for five purposes:
 recalling of the Parliament
 acceding to the European Union
 accepting substantial changes in the terms regarding the membership in the European Union
 accepting legislation suspended by the President
 amending the Constitution or adopting a law

One tenth of registered voters has the right to initiate a national referendum regarding recalling of the Parliament. Voter turnout needed is two thirds of the number of the voters who participated in the last elections for the Parliament.

Substantial changes in the terms regarding the membership of Latvia in the European Union shall be decided by a national referendum if such referendum is requested by at least one-half of the members of the Parliament.

A referendum will be held on a law if a President suspends it, and in a two-month period one tenth of the electorate requests a referendum, except if the Parliament again adopts the law with three three-quarters super-majority. Voter turnout needed is 50% of the number of the voters who participated in the last elections for the Parliament.

The constitution limits issues which can be submitted to a referendum. It forbids issues like budget, taxes, military conscription, declaration of war, peace treaties, agreements with other nations, etc.; according to the Constitutional Court of Latvia, the intent of initiators to organise a referendum cannot entail repeal of ‘the principle of wholeness of the Constitution of Latvia’ that ‘prohibits interpretation of separate norms of the Constitution of Latvia as isolated from the other Constitution of Latvia norms, because the Constitution of Latvia as a document, which is a cohesive whole, influences the contents and sense of the norm’; this means that at least the basic human rights and general principles of law listed in the Constitution of Latvia—such as the right of minorities to preserve and develop their language and their ethnic and cultural identity, the rights of a child, and the right to equality and non-discrimination, not to mention the principles of proportionality, legal certainty, and legitimate expectations —have to be honoured in the interpretation of all proposed amendments

One tenth of the electorate can request amendment of the Constitution adoption of a law. Absolute majority is required for such a referendum to pass. The exception is decision regarding substantial changes in the terms regarding membership in the EU - those measures need voter turnout of 50% of the number of the voters who participated in the last elections for the Parliament.

There were 13 referendums in Latvia's history, of that 4 in 1923 - 1934 period and 9 since 1991.

Lithuania

Lithuania has held 12 referendums since 1991.
300,000 signatures are needed to initiate a referendum.

Luxembourg

The Constitution of Luxembourg mentions the referendum in Article 51: "Voters will be asked to vote by way of referendum in the cases and under the conditions determined by law." The only details about execution of referendums are found in Article 114 which deals with constitutional amendments. There are no other provisions regarding referendums in Luxembourg.

The referendum on constitutional amendment (defined in Article 114) is binding. Referendums in general (defined in Article 51) are not explicitly stated to be binding.

There were four referendums in Luxembourg since 1919:
 the referendum on head of state and economic union in 1919
 the referendum on banning the Communist party in 1937
 European Constitution referendum in 2005
 the referendum on election rules in 2015

Malta

There are three types of referendums in Malta: constitutional, consultative and abrogative referendums.

Constitutional referendums are required by article 66(3) of the Constitution of Malta. While binding, it is limited to the single instance of amending the Constitutional provision on the maximum parliamentary term of five years. This type of referendum has never taken place.

The other categories of referendums are regulated by the Referenda Act. "Consultative" referendums (the Act does not use the term) can either take place prior to the assent of a bill in the House of Representatives or following the parliamentary procedure in a form of a conditional clause in the said bill. In the former case it would not legally bind Parliament to approve the said legislation irrelevant of the result of the said referendum, however the latter case, it would be conventionally binding on the President to promulgate the bill into law. There has been five referendums like this on a national level, one on a regional level (1973 Gozo Civic Council referendum) and a number of local referendums organised by single Local Councils.

An abrogative referendum has never been held and, if invoked and successful, can abrogate pieces of legislation barring some exceptions, notably financial and constitutional law.

Moldova

According to Article 75 of the Constitution of Moldova, "(1) Problems of utmost gravity or urgency confronting the Moldovan society or State shall be resolved by referendum. (2) The decisions passed in consequence of the results produced by the republican referendum have supreme judicial power." There were four referendums held in Moldova, in 1994, 1999, 2010 and 2019.

Netherlands

Since 1 July 2015, most laws can be subjected to a consultative referendum after their approval by the States General, following a request by 300,000 people.

Before that date, in principle, there was no permanent provision in law for a referendum. However, from 2002 until 2005, there was a Temporary Referendum Law in place, which allowed for non-binding referendums, known in Dutch as Volksraadpleging ("People's Consultation"), to be organised for laws already approved by the House of Representatives. No referendum was called based on this law.

In order to hold the 2005 referendum on the Treaty establishing a Constitution for Europe, a different law was temporarily put in place. That referendum was the first national referendum in the Netherlands in 200 years (1805 Batavian Republic constitutional referendum), and it was the result of an initiative proposal by parliamentarians Farah Karimi (GroenLinks), Niesco Dubbelboer (Labour) and Boris van der Ham (Democrats 66).

The 2016 Dutch Ukraine–European Union Association Agreement referendum is the second most recent Dutch referendum; the 2018 Dutch Intelligence and Security Services Act referendum was held in March 2018.

On 18 February 2018 the option for a non-binding referendum was repealed. 

Since 29 January 2019 there have been four attempts to introduce a corrective referendum, which would give the citizens of the Netherlands an option to have a referendum to cancel a new law that has already been accepted by the House of Representatives and the Senate. The first three attempts have failed due to its requirement of a two-third approval rate in both chambers and political parties VVD, CDA and SGP being against the corrective referendum. The fourth attempt is currently ongoing.

Norway
The Norwegian Constitution does not mention referendums at all, and as such, referendums are not a part of Norwegian political practice. However, six advisory referendums have been held in Norway, most notably, the referendums on Norwegian EU membership, and the referendum for dissolving the union with Sweden. It is worth noting that these referendums, and potential future referendums, although legitimate as part of Norwegian constitutional convention, will not have any legal binding: They will merely be advisory, and the final decision will be taken by the Norwegian parliament, who may choose (albeit unlikely) to disregard the will of the Norwegian people as expressed through the referendum.

Poland

There have been four referendums in the modern Poland: 
 two in 1996:
 General property enfranchisement of citizens referendum
 Referendum about certain ways of use of public property
 one in 1997 - Referendum on the Constitution
 one in 2003 - Referendum on joining the EU

A referendum on a proposed EU constitution was planned in 2005, but has been put on hold after the rejection of constitution by French voters.

Portugal

The referendum in Portugal is called by the President of Portugal (if they so decide), on a proposal submitted by the Assembly or the Government. Referendums are binding if turnout is higher than 50% of registered voters. Citizens of Portugal have the right to submit to the Assembly an initiative for a referendum.

The referendum can be held only on "important issues concerning the national interest". The referendum cannot be held on amendments to the Constitution, and some issues such as budget and competences of the Assembly.

There have been three referendums in modern Portugal:
 abortion referendum of 1998
 regionalisation referendum of 1998
 abortion referendum of 2007
All three referendums had turnouts of less than 50%, which meant they were not binding. Nonetheless, the winning option on all three referendums was honoured by the governments of the time.

Romania

The Constitution of Romania defines that a referendum has to be called to suspend the President from office, or amend the Constitution. Moreover, a referendum can be called on matters of national interest by the President of Romania after consultation with Parliament.

There have been 8 referendums in post-communist Romania, and one at the county level:
 2 constitutional referendums: in 1991 and 2003
 2 presidential impeachment referendums: in May 2007 and in 2012
 voting system referendum in November 2007
 parliamentary reform referendum in 2009
 referendum regarding the definition of family and another one only in the Olt County to rename it to "Olt-Romanați County" in 2018 at the same time
 referendum about justice and corruption in 2019

Serbia

The Constitution of the Republic of Serbia was adopted on a referendum held in 28–29 October 2006. The constitutional referendum passed with 3,521,724 voting a 53.04% majority. 3,645,517 or 54.91% voted on the referendum, which made it legitimate.

Slovenia
There was an independence referendum in Slovenia on 23 December 1990. The turnout was 93.3% of all voters, of which 94.8% cast a vote in support of independence. It was the first such referendum in one of the then Yugoslavian republics. The results were announced on 26 December, and on 25 June 1991, the Slovenian parliament passed an independence law proclaiming Slovenia a sovereign country. This was followed by the Ten-Day War, in which Slovenian forces drove the Yugoslav People's Army out of the country. In 2015, Slovenia held another referendum on a bill legalizing same-sex marriage, which was rejected by the majority of voters.

Spain
In a referendum in Spain (Referéndum para la reforma política, literally "Referendum for political reformation") on 15 December 1976, after the death of Francisco Franco, 94% of voters approved a Political Reform Bill to establish democracy. On 6 December 1978 a further referendum was held to approve a new Constitution. Spaniards chose (91.8% of voters) to approve the Constitution. Also, in 1986 another referendum approved Spain's membership of NATO.

Sweden

The Constitution of Sweden provides for both binding and non-binding referendums. Since the introduction of parliamentary democracy, six referendums have been held: the first was about alcohol prohibition in 1922, and the most recent was about euro membership in 2003. All have been non-binding, consultative referendums. Two, in 1957 and 1980, were multiple-choice referendums.

Switzerland

In Switzerland, Swiss voters can demand a binding referendum at federal, cantonal, and municipal level. They are a central feature of Swiss political life. It is not the government's choice whether or when a referendum is held, but it is a legal procedure regulated by the Swiss constitution. There are two types of referendums:
 Optional referendum: Any federal law, certain other federal resolutions, and international treaties that are ongoing in nature, or any change to Swiss law may be subject to referendum if at least 50,000 people or eight cantons have petitioned to do so within 100 days. Within cantons and municipalities, the required number of people is smaller, and there may be additional causes for a facultative referendum, e.g., expenditures that exceed a certain amount of money. The facultative referendum is the most common type of referendum, and it is mostly carried out by political parties or by interest groups.
 Mandatory referendum: There must be a referendum on any amendments to the constitution and on any joining of a multinational community or organization for collective security. In many municipalities, expenditures that exceed a certain amount of money also are subject to the obligatory referendum. Constitutional amendments are proposed by the parliament or by the cantons or by federal popular initiative. Citizen's initiatives at the federal level need to collect 100,000 valid signatures within 18 months, and must not contradict international laws or treaties. Often, parliament elaborates a counter-proposal to an initiative, leading to a multiple-choice referendum. Very few such initiatives pass the vote, but more often, the parliamentary counter proposal is approved.

The possibility of facultative referendums forces the parliament to search for a compromise between the major interest groups. In many cases, the mere threat of a facultative referendum or of an initiative is enough to make the parliament adjust a law.

The referendums are said, by their adversaries, to slow politics down. On the other hand, empirical scientists, e.g. Bruno S. Frey among many, show that this and other instruments of citizens' participation, direct democracy, contribute to stability and happiness.

The votes on referendums are always held on a weekend (the voting's official date is set to Sundays), typically three or four times a year, and in most cases, the votes concern several referendums at the same time, usually at different political levels (federal, cantonal, municipal) about several different subjects. Referendums are also often combined with elections. Voter turnout is around 40% to 50%, unless there is an election or the subject of a referendum is of a critical nature. The decisions made in referendums tend to be conservative. Citizens' initiatives are usually not passed. The federal rule and referendums have been regularly used in Switzerland since its inauguration as a modern state: almost 600 national votes have been held since 1848.

Turkey

Seven nationwide referendums have been held in Turkey since its foundation in 1923. Amendments to the constitution can be put to referendum by both the legislative branch (parliament) and the executive branch (president). The Constitution of Turkey provides for binding constitutional referendums.

Ukraine

The Crimean status referendum, 2014 was a referendum on the status of Crimea held on March 16, 2014, by the legislature of Autonomous Republic of Crimea as well as by the local government of Sevastopol, both subdivisions of Ukraine at the time. The referendum asked the people of Crimea whether they wanted to join Russia as a federal subject, or if they wanted to restore the 1992 Crimean constitution and Crimea's status as a part of Ukraine.

The available choices did not include keeping the status quo of Crimea and Sevastopol as they were at the moment the referendum was held. The 1992 constitution accords greater powers to the Crimean parliament including full sovereign powers to establish relations with other states, therefore many commentators argued that both provided referendum choices would result in de facto separation from Ukraine.

Supreme Council of Crimea considered the ousting of Ukrainian President Viktor Yanukovych in the 2014 Ukrainian revolution as a coup and the new interim government in Kyiv as illegitimate and stated that the referendum is a response to these developments. The referendum was regarded as illegitimate by most countries including all European Union members, the United States and Canada because of the events surrounding it including the plebiscite being held while the peninsula was occupied by Russian soldiers. Thirteen members of the United Nations Security Council voted in favor of a resolution declaring the referendum invalid, but Russia vetoed it and China abstained. A United Nations General Assembly resolution was later adopted, by a vote of 100 in favor vs. 11 against with 58 abstentions, which declared the referendum invalid and affirmed Ukraine's territorial integrity. The Mejlis of the Crimean Tatar People called for a boycott of the referendum.

Russia officially recognized the results of the Crimean referendum and claims that unilateral Kosovo declaration of independence has set a precedent, which allows secession of Crimea from Ukraine. Such parallels are disputed by Western scholars, however.

The official result from the Autonomous Republic of Crimea was a 96.77 percent vote for integration of the region into the Russian Federation with an 83.1 percent voter turnout. The Mejlis Deputy Chairman Akhtem Chiygoz stated that the actual turnout could not have exceed 30–40 percent, whilst former Russian government adviser Andrey Illarionov stated that the actual support for the reunification of Crimea with Russia was about 34 percent, citing results of previous polls over past three years. However, according to the Gallup's survey performed on 21–27 April, 82.8% of Crimean people consider the referendum results reflecting most Crimeans’ views, and 73.9% of Crimeans say Crimea's becoming part of Russia will make life better for themselves and their families, just 5.5% disagree.

Following the referendum, Supreme Council of Crimea and Sevastopol City Council declared independence of Crimea from Ukraine and requested to join the Russian Federation. On the same day, Russia recognized Crimea as a sovereign state.

United Kingdom

Although Acts of Parliament may permit referendums to take place, the doctrine of parliamentary sovereignty means any Act of Parliament giving effect to a referendum result could be reversed by a subsequent Act of Parliament. As a result, referendums in the United Kingdom cannot be constitutionally binding, although they will usually have a persuasive political effect.

Major referendums are rare; only three have been put to the entire UK electorate. The first was the 1975 United Kingdom European Communities membership referendum, which was held two years after British accession to the European Economic Community to gauge support for continued membership. The second was the 2011 United Kingdom Alternative Vote referendum. This was to vote on changing the 'First Past the Post' system to an alternative electoral system, the Alternative Vote.

Referendums have been held in individual parts of the United Kingdom on issues relating to devolution in Scotland and Wales, an elected Mayor of London and a Greater London Authority for Greater London, a regional assembly for the North-East of England and the constitutional status and governance of Northern Ireland. Since 1973, the year of the first such plebiscite, there have been nine major referendums.

In 2004, Her Majesty's Government promised a UK-wide referendum on the new European Constitution, but this was postponed in 2005 following the defeats of the French and Dutch referendums. Due to the replacement of the European Constitution with the Treaty of Lisbon, there was no obligation for a referendum. Referendums have also been proposed, but not held, on the replacement of the pound sterling with the euro as the currency of the United Kingdom.

A national referendum was held in Scotland on the 18th of September 2014. Voters were asked to answer Yes or No to the question: "Should Scotland be an independent country?" to which 55% of Scots voted "No".

At the local level, the Government has put proposals for directly-elected mayors to 37 local authority areas by referendum. The 1972 Local Government Act also contains a little-used provision that allows non-binding local referendums on any issue to be called by small groups of voters. Strathclyde Regional Council held a postal referendum in 1994 on whether control of water and sewerage services should be transferred to appointed boards: this was largely a political tactic, since this was the policy of the UK Government at the time. The UK Parliament enacted the legislation anyway, and it came into force on 1 April 1996.

On Thursday 23 June 2016 a third UK-wide referendum was held on the issue of the United Kingdom's continuing membership of the European Union 41 years after the first referendum. The referendum was called by the Prime Minister David Cameron and Her Majesty's Government after an agreement was struck in Brussels with the European Union which renegotiated the membership of the United Kingdom. This referendum resulted in a majority voting to leave the EU by 52% of votes as opposed to 48% of votes who voted to remain, causing unprecedented ramifications both within the UK, Europe and internationally, and forced the resignation of David Cameron the following day (he officially left office on July 13).

North America

Canada

Referendums are rare in Canada and only three have ever occurred at the federal level: 1898 on Prohibition, 1942 on WWII conscription, and 1992 on the Charlottetown Accord. Although the Constitution of Canada does not expressly require that amendments be approved by referendum, many argue that, in light of the precedent set by the Charlottetown Accord referendum, this may have become a constitutional convention.

A referendum can also occur at the provincial level. The 1980 and 1995 referendums on the secession of Québec are notable cases. In conjunction with the provincial election in 2007, the province of Ontario voted on a mixed-member proportional representation electoral system and British Columbia held two consecutive referendums on BC-STV in 2005 and 2009. In 2011 British Columbia held yet another referendum against a newly imposed HST tax. The results ended up making British Columbia the first province to overturn the harmonization of provincial and federal taxes, joining it with Alberta, which not having a provincial sales tax, has never participated in the HST. A referendum was held in the Canadian province of Prince Edward Island on November 28, 2005 to determine whether or not to adopt the Mixed Member Proportional Representation System. The referendum failed.

Mexico
A law allowing consulta popular ("popular consultation") was passed on March 14, 2014. Such a consultation may be requested by the President, 33% of the Chamber of Deputies, the Senate, or 2% of voters.

A series of unofficial consultations have also been held in 2018 and 2019:
November 24–25, 2018, Isthmus of Tehuantepec train. 90.3% of participants approved.
November 24–25, 2018, Mayan Train. 946,081 people voted (1% of the population); 89.9% in favor. Another consultation will take place on December 15, 2019.
November 24–25, 2018, refinery in Dos Bocas, Tabasco. 91.6% of voters approved the project.
November 24–25, 2018, social programs. Seven programs were approved by over 90% of voters.
February 23–24, 2019, Thermo-electric plant in Morelos. 55,715 people voted in Morelos, Puebla, and Tlaxcala. The plant was approved. 
October 27–28, 2018, construction of a new airport for Mexico City. 1,067,859 votes were cast, 29% in favor of the Texcoco Airport and 69.5% in favor of the Santa Lucia Airport.
July 21, 2019, term (2 or 5 years) of the Governor of Baja California. 1.89% of eligible voters participated, and 84% approved the 5-year term.

United States

There is no provision for the holding of referendums at the federal level in the United States, which the Constitution does not provide for.

However, 24 states (principally in the West, but also in Eastern states, such as Massachusetts) and many local and city governments provide for referendums and citizen's initiatives. Such state-level referendums, as an example, have resulted in the limitation of property taxes as with California's Proposition 13 and Massachusetts' Proposition 2½ in the late 20th century. This type of referendum is frequently known as a  "ballot measure" or are also commonly known as "propositions" or simply "questions".

In the United States ballot measures may be established by several different processes which vary amongst the states:

 Initiative, in which any citizen or organization may gather a predetermined number of signatures to qualify a measure for the ballot;
 Popular referendum, in which a predetermined number of signatures (typically lower than the number required for an initiative) qualifies a ballot measure repealing a specific act of the legislature;
 Legislative referral (a.k.a. "legislative referendum"), in which the legislature puts proposed legislation up for popular vote (either voluntarily or, in the case of a constitutional amendment as a required procedure).
 Recall election, in which voters can remove an elected official from office through a direct vote before that official's term has ended

Central and South America

Brazil
Three nationwide referendums have been held so far in Brazilian history.

In 1963, the country had just adopted the parliamentary government system, but in a referendum held in 1963, the Brazilian population was consulted about which government system should be enacted in the country and it was decided to have Brazil return to a Presidential system.

In 1993, another referendum to decide Brazil's government system was held. Voters could choose to keep the presidential republic system, adopt a parliamentary republic system, or adopt a parliamentary monarchy system. The majority of voters opined to maintain the current presidential government system.

In 2005 a referendum was held to consult the population about their opinion on the possibility of forbidding the sale and civilian possession of firearms and ammunition nationwide. This referendum was offered by the government as part of a violence minimization initiative known as project disarmament. Most voters declared themselves contrary to the ban and the laws regarding commerce and ownership of weapons in the country remained unaltered.

Chile
There have been four plebiscites and one "consultation" in Chilean history. In 1925, a plebiscite was held over a new constitution that would replace a semi-parliamentary system with a presidential one. The "Yes" vote won overwhelmingly, with 95% of the vote.

In 1978, after the United Nations protested against Pinochet's régime, the country's military government held a national consultation, which asked if people supported Pinochet's rule. The "Yes" vote won with 74%, although the results have been questioned.

Another constitutional plebiscite was held in 1980. The "Yes" won with 68.5%, prolonging Pinochet's term until 1989 and replacing the 1925 Constitution with a new one still used today. The results of this plebiscite have also been questioned by Pinochet's opponents, because of the lack of voters registration.

In a historical plebiscite held in 1988, 56% voted to end the military régime. The next year, yet another plebiscite was held for constitutional changes for the transition to a democratic government (the "Yes" vote won with 91%).

There have been several referendums in individual municipalities in Chile since the return to civilian rule in 1990. A referendum, which took place in 2006 in Las Condes, over the construction of a mall was noteworthy for being the first instance in Chilean history where electronic voting machines were used.

Costa Rica
The first referendum held in Costa Rica was October 7, 2007, to approve or reject the free trade agreement with Central America, Dominican Republic (Costa Rica already has FTAs with the latter) and the United States known as the Dominican Republic – Central America Free Trade Agreement (DR-CAFTA).

It was very narrowly approved (49.030 votes). Results were 51.62% voted in favour and 48.38% against it. It is currently the only free trade agreement in the world that has been approved on a referendum.

From 2008 to 2010 conservative groups, linked to religious institutions, managed to collect 150,000 signatures to call a referendum to decline unions between same-sex couples. The Supreme Elections Tribunal (TSE) had scheduled the consultation on December 5, 2010.

However, the Constitutional Chamber of the Supreme Court rejected the referendum stating that "The rights of minorities that arise from anti-majoritarian claims can not be subjected to a referendum process which the majority imposes". This consideration supports the main argument of those who rejected the consultation considered a violation of human rights, among these gay groups and humanitarian actors.

The Board further considered that "people who have sex with same sex are a group at disadvantage and discrimination, which requires the support of public authorities for the recognition of their constitutional rights or other legislation". Decisions of the Constitutional Court are final so the ruling stopped the referendum and opened to the Congress the opportunity to continue discussing the bill on the recognition of homosexual unions.

Puerto Rico
Four Puerto Rican status referendums (in 1967, 1993, 1998 and 2012) have taken place in Puerto Rico to determine whether the insular area should become an independent nation (comprising a republic and an associated republic), apply for statehood, or maintain commonwealth (Estado Libre Asociado) status. Remaining a commonwealth has been the result of the first three referendums. The fourth referendum resulted in a majority being pro-statehood. There was also a 2005 referendum (Resolution 64) to determine whether the Legislative Assembly of Puerto Rico should be restructured (among other changes to become unicameral).

Uruguay

The Uruguayan constitution allows citizens to challenge laws approved by Parliament by use of a referendum or to propose changes to the Constitution by the use of a plebiscite. This right has been used a few times in the past 15 years: in 1989, to confirm or reject an amnesty to members of the military who violated human rights during the military regime (1973–1985); in 1989, to increase pensioners' incomes; in 1992, to consider the partial privatization of public utilities companies; and, in 2004, to maintain water resources in government control.

Venezuela
The 1999 constitution of Venezuela, created by the Chávez government, and approved by referendum, brought in the concept of requiring referendums for constitutional changes, as well as providing for recall referendums of elected officials (which require petitions of a minimum percentage of voters to be submitted). In the Venezuelan recall referendum of 2004 voters determined whether or not Hugo Chávez, the former President of Venezuela, should be recalled from office. The result of the referendum was to not recall Chávez.

Oceania

Australia

Approval in a referendum is necessary in order to amend the Australian constitution. A bill must first be passed by both houses of Parliament or, in certain limited circumstances, by only one house of Parliament, and is then submitted to a referendum. If a majority of those voting, as well as separate majorities in each of a majority of states (and where appropriate a majority of people in any affected state) vote in favor of the amendment, it is presented for Royal Assent, given in the Queen's name by the Governor-General.

New Zealand

New Zealand has two types of referendum. Government referendums are predominantly about constitutional issues. However, there are also referendums on other issues. Furthermore, constitutional issues, such as the establishment of the Supreme Court of New Zealand, may be done without a referendum. Government referendums can be binding or non-binding.

Since 1993, New Zealand also has provision for non-binding citizens-initiated referendums. To initiate a citizens-initiated referendum on a particular issue, proponents of the referendum apply to the Clerk of the House of Representatives, and once the question wording is determined, proponents have twelve months to compile a petition containing signatures from at least ten percent of all registered voters. Only five citizens-initiated referendums have gone to a vote: one in 1995, two in 1999, one in 2009 and another held in late 2013.

See also
 Direct Democracy
 History of direct democracy in the United States
 Referendums related to the European Union

Specific referendums

 Arizona Proposition 204, 2006
 Australian referendum, 1967 (Aboriginals)
 Belfast Agreement (1998)
 2004 Bolivian gas referendum
 Carinthian Plebiscite (1920)
 2004 Cypriot Annan Plan referendum
 Edinburgh congestion charge (2005)
 2005 Kenyan constitutional referendum
 1992 Montenegrin independence referendum
 2006 Montenegrin independence referendum
 1919 Norwegian prohibition referendum
 1926 Norwegian continued prohibition referendum
 1972 Norwegian European Communities membership referendum
 1994 Norwegian European Union membership referendum
 2006 Panama Canal expansion referendum
 Puerto Rico status referendums (1967, 1993, 1998)
 Republic of China referendums
 2006 Serbian constitutional referendum
 1992 South African referendum
 List of Swiss federal referendums
 2006 Tokelauan self-determination referendum
 2004 Venezuelan recall referendum
 Referendums in Canada
 1957 Alberta liquor plebiscite
 2002 British Columbia aboriginal treaty referendum
 2005 British Columbia electoral reform referendum
 2009 British Columbia electoral reform referendum
 Charlottetown Accord
 List of Northwest Territories plebiscites
 1948 Newfoundland referendums
 1982 Northwest Territories division plebiscite
 1995 Nunavut capital plebiscite
 2007 Ontario electoral reform referendum
 1894 Ontario prohibition plebiscite
 1902 Ontario prohibition referendum
 1919 Ontario prohibition referendum
 1921 Ontario prohibition referendum
 1924 Ontario prohibition referendum
 2005 Prince Edward Island electoral reform referendum
 1980 Quebec referendum
 1995 Quebec referendum
 2007 Saint John, New Brunswick ward plebiscite
 Referendums in the United Kingdom
 1975 United Kingdom European Communities membership referendum
 United Kingdom European Constitution referendum (proposed)
 2011 United Kingdom Alternative Vote referendum
 2016 United Kingdom European Union membership referendum
 2004 Northern England devolution referendums
 1998 Northern Ireland Belfast Agreement referendum
 1973 Northern Ireland sovereignty referendum
 1979 Scottish devolution referendum
 1997 Scottish devolution referendum
 1979 Welsh devolution referendum
 1997 Welsh devolution referendum
 2011 Welsh devolution referendum
 Edinburgh congestion charge
 1998 Greater London Authority referendum
 Referendums related to European Union accession:
 1972 Danish European Communities membership referendum
 1972 Norwegian European Communities membership referendum
 1994 Norwegian European Union membership referendum
 1994 Swedish European Union membership referendum (non-binding)
 2003 Polish European Union membership referendum

References